Roy Orbison (April 23, 1936 – December 6, 1988) was an American singer-songwriter who found the most success in the early rock and roll era from 1956 to 1964. He later enjoyed a resurgence in the late 1980s with chart success as a member of the Traveling Wilburys and with his Mystery Girl album, which included the posthumous hit single "You Got It". At the height of his popularity, 22 of Orbison's songs placed on the US Billboard Top 40 chart, and six peaked in the top five, including two number-one hits. In the UK, Orbison scored ten top-10 hits between 1960 and 1966, including three number-one singles.

Born and raised in Texas, Orbison got his start in a rockabilly band in high school. According to The Authorized Roy Orbison, Orbison's first release was in March 1956 on the Je-Wel label. He broke into professional music under Sam Phillips at Sun Records in the summer of 1956, but he found only marginal success there. After a couple years writing for other musicians (including "Claudette", recorded by The Everly Brothers), Orbison recorded several songs at Monument Records under producer Fred Foster starting in 1959. With Foster, Orbison and his frequent songwriting partners Joe Melson and Bill Dees tailored many of Orbison's songs for his unique voice; his most popular songs were dramatic ballads ending with emotional crescendos that showcased his powerful vocals. After his biggest hit in 1964, "Oh, Pretty Woman", Orbison continued to record and chart intermittently in the UK and Australia, but it was not until 1987 that he again found the level of popular worldwide success he had known in the early 1960s, when his original recording of "In Dreams" was used in David Lynch's film Blue Velvet. The following year, Orbison co-founded the supergroup Traveling Wilburys with George Harrison, Jeff Lynne, Bob Dylan and Tom Petty. Lynne produced Orbison's final album Mystery Girl, which was released posthumously in February 1989.

This discography shows main official U.S. and U.K. releases. According to the discography in The Authorized Roy Orbison, there were numerous international single and album releases of importance (not released in the U.S. or U.K.) like the German "San Fernando" b/w "Mama" (London DL 20 726).

Albums

Studio albums

Collaboration albums

Live albums

Compilation albums
There are hundreds of compilations and greatest hits of Roy Orbison released internationally. Below is a selection of all the compilation albums which have achieved global chart peaks. For a more complete list of compilation releases, see Discogs.

Video albums

Singles

Billboard Year-End performances

Music videos

Collaborations and guest appearances
 "Find My Baby for Me" – Sonny Burgess
 "I Was a Fool" – Ken Cook
 "Jenny" – Ken Cook
 "I Fell in Love" – Ken Cook
 "Rockabilly Gal" – Hayden Thompson
 "Greenback Dollar", "Watch and Chain" – Ray Harris
 "Cast Iron Arm" – Johnny Wilson
 "You've Got Love" – Johnny Wilson
 "Don't Do Me This Way" – Ricky Tucker (reportedly with Buddy Holly)
 "Patty Baby" – Ricky Tucker (reportedly with Buddy Holly)
 "Fools like Me" – Jerry Lee Lewis
 "No One Really Cares" – Kris Jensen
 "Shook Up" – Joe Melson
 "Dance" – Joe Melson
 "I'm in a Blue Mood" – Conway Twitty
 "Tennessee Owns My Soul" – Bill Dees
 "I Belong to Him" – Jessi Colter with Waylon Jennings
 "Indian Summer" – Gatlin Brothers & Barry Gibb
 "Leah" – Bertie Higgins
 "Beyond the End" – Jimmy Buffett
 "Zombie Zoo" – Tom Petty
 "Life Fades Away" – Written by Glenn Danzig
 "Crying" – k.d. lang
 "Zigzag" on Zig Zag (Original Motion Picture Score) (MGM, 1970)

Citations

References

External links
 

 
 
Rock music discographies